Rinor Nushi (born 11 January 1996) is a Swedish footballer who plays as a forward for Segeltorps IF.

Career
At the age of 14, Nushi trained with the youth academy of Spanish La Liga side Barcelona. He started his career with AFC Eskilstuna in the Swedish sixth division. Before the second half of 2012–13, Nushi signed for the reserves of English Premier League club West Ham after training with Juventus in the Italian Serie A and Dutch team FC Twente.

In 2013, he returned to AFC Eskilstuna in the Swedish third division, helping them earn promotion to the Swedish top flight within four seasons.  In 2019, he signed for Swedish fourth division outfit Newroz FC. Before the 2020 season, Nushi signed for Segeltorps IF in the Swedish fifth division.

References

External links
 

Living people
1996 births
Swedish footballers
Association football forwards
Sweden youth international footballers
AFC Eskilstuna players
Sollentuna FK players
Västerås SK Fotboll players
Swedish expatriate footballers
Swedish expatriate sportspeople in England
Expatriate footballers in England